The Peony class is a series of 8 container ships built for COSCO SHIPPING Lines. The ships have a maximum theoretical capacity of 13,800 TEU. The ships were built by Shanghai Jiangnan Changxing Shipbuilding at their shipyard in Shanghai.

The ships were originally ordered by China Shipping Container Lines (CSCL) in 2015 at a total cost of 934.4 million USD.

List of ships

References 

Container ship classes
Ships of COSCO Shipping